Duke of Grafton is a title in the Peerage of England. It was created in 1675 by Charles II of England for Henry FitzRoy, his second illegitimate son by the Duchess of Cleveland. The most notable duke of Grafton was Augustus FitzRoy, 3rd Duke of Grafton, who served as Prime Minister from 1768–1770.

The Duke of Grafton holds three subsidiary titles, all created in 1675 in the peerage of England: Earl of Euston, Viscount Ipswich, and Baron Sudbury. Between 1723 and 1936 the dukes, being descended from the 1st Duke's wife Isabella FitzRoy, 2nd Countess of Arlington, also held the titles Earl of Arlington, Viscount Thetford and Baron Arlington. Those titles fell into abeyance between the 9th Duke's sisters, with the abeyance of the barony of Arlington being ended in 1999.

The Dukes "created" and owned the London district of Fitzrovia, so named for their family name.

The title of the dukedom refers to the Honour of Grafton in the southeast of Northamptonshire, the titular village now being called Grafton Regis.

The family seat is Euston Hall in Suffolk, an 11,000-acre estate straddling the Norfolk-Suffolk border. The main burial places of the senior branch of the family are in and beside the parish church of Saint Genevieve at Euston, Suffolk.

The Duke of Grafton is fourth in the order of precedence after the dukes of Norfolk, Somerset, and Richmond.

Dukes of Grafton (1675)

Other titles (all): Earl of Euston, Viscount Ipswich and Baron Sudbury (1675)
Henry FitzRoy, 1st Duke of Grafton (1663–1690), second illegitimate son of Charles II and the Duchess of Cleveland; 
Other titles (2nd–9th Dukes): Earl of Arlington and Viscount Thetford (1672), Baron Arlington (1664), Baron Arlington (1672)
Charles FitzRoy, 2nd Duke of Grafton (1683–1757), only son of the 1st Duke
Charles FitzRoy, Earl of Euston (1714–1715), eldest son of the 2nd Duke, died young
George FitzRoy, Earl of Euston (1715–1747), second son of the 2nd Duke, predeceased his father without issue
Augustus Henry FitzRoy, 3rd Duke of Grafton (1735–1811), eldest son of Lord Augustus FitzRoy, third son of the 2nd Duke; Prime Minister, 1768–70
George Henry FitzRoy, 4th Duke of Grafton (1760–1844), eldest son of the 3rd Duke
Henry FitzRoy, 5th Duke of Grafton (1790–1863), eldest son of the 4th Duke
William Henry FitzRoy, 6th Duke of Grafton (1819–1882), eldest son of the 5th Duke, died without issue
Augustus Charles Lennox FitzRoy, 7th Duke of Grafton (1821–1918), second son of the 5th Duke
Henry James FitzRoy, Earl of Euston (1848–1912), eldest son of the 7th Duke, predeceased his father without issue
Alfred William Maitland Fitzroy, 8th Duke of Grafton (1850–1930), second son of the 7th Duke
William Henry Alfred Fitzroy, Viscount Ipswich (1884–1918), only son of the 8th Duke, predeceased both his father and grandfather
John Charles William FitzRoy, 9th Duke of Grafton (1914–1936), only son of William FitzRoy, Viscount Ipswich, died unmarried
Charles Alfred Euston FitzRoy, 10th Duke of Grafton (1892–1970), eldest son of the Rev. Lord Charles Edward FitzRoy, third and youngest son of the 7th Duke
Hugh Denis Charles FitzRoy, 11th Duke of Grafton (1919–2011), eldest son of the 10th Duke
James Oliver Charles FitzRoy, Earl of Euston (1947–2009), eldest son of the 11th Duke, predeceased his father in 2009
Henry Oliver Charles FitzRoy, 12th Duke of Grafton (b. 1978), only son of Lord Euston

The heir apparent is the present holder's son, Alfred James Charles FitzRoy, Earl of Euston (b. 2012).

Arms

Family tree

See also
Viscount Daventry (created for Muriel FitzRoy the widow of the Speaker Edward FitzRoy the second son of Charles FitzRoy, 3rd Baron Southampton).
Baron Southampton (created for Charles FitzRoy the son of Lord Augustus FitzRoy).

References

Further reading

Falk, Bernard. The Royal Fitz Roys; Dukes of Grafton through Four Centuries. Hutchinson, 1950.

External links

 Cracroft's Peerage page

Dukedoms in the Peerage of England
Noble titles created in 1675
Grafton